The Instituto Nacional de Saúde Dr. Ricardo Jorge (INSA) (English: National Institute of Health Dr. Ricardo Jorge) is a public institution under the Portuguese Ministry of Health, with self scientific, technical, administrative, and financial autonomy.

History
Founded in 1899 by physician and humanist Ricardo Jorge (Porto, 1858 - Lisbon, 1939), as a research institution of the Portuguese health system, the INSA has a threefold mission of laboratory in health issues, national reference laboratory and national observatory of health.

Organization
The INSA has operating units in its headquarters in Lisbon, Porto (in two centers: Center for Public Health Doctor Gonçalves Ferreira and Center for Medical Genetics Jacinto Magalhães) and Águas de Moura (Center for Studies on Vectors and Infectious Diseases Dr. Francisco Cambournac).

The INSA is organized in six major departments:

Department of Food and Nutrition; 
Department of Infectious Diseases; 
Department of Epidemiology; 
Department of Genetics; 
Department of Health Promotion and Chronic Diseases; 
Department of Environmental Health

Past and present staff
 Laura Ayres

External links
Official site

Medical research institutes in Portugal
1899 establishments in Portugal
Organizations established in 1899